Summer Spectacular was a major annual professional wrestling event produced by Frontier Martial-Arts Wrestling during the month of August. The supercard was first held in 1990 in response to World Wrestling Federation's August event SummerSlam. The event would return and be held for two consecutive years in 1993 and 1994. The 1996 edition was subtitled "Shiodome Legend", which would become the event's name for the 1997 edition. This would be the last edition as FMW began producing pay-per-view events in 1998. The event was considered one of the FMW's four big supercards of the year, along with FMW Anniversary Show, Fall Spectacular and Year End Spectacular.

Dates, venues and main events

References